Hertia is a genus of flowering plants in the sunflower family, native to Africa and southwestern Asia.

 Species

References

Senecioneae
Asteraceae genera